John Campbell (died 1613) was a Scottish clergyman who served as the Protestant Bishop of Argyll from 1611 to 1613.

Life

Born in Kilmartin, he was the eldest son of Neil Campbell, Bishop of Argyll. 

He succeeded his father as bishop of the diocese of Argyll. He was nominated on 1 June 1608 and consecrated sometime between 23 January and 24 February 1611.

He died of facial cancer in January 1613.

Family

He married twice, first to an unnamed woman of the MacDougall of Raray family and then to Margaret, daughter of Gavin Hamilton, Bishop of Galloway.

References

1613 deaths
Bishops of Argyll
John Campbell (bishop of Argyll)
Year of birth unknown
Members of the Parliament of Scotland 1612
Scottish bishops 1560–1638